USS Westpool (ID-3675) – sometimes written as West Pool – was a cargo ship of the United States Navy that served during World War I and its immediate aftermath. As SS Westpool, she was sunk during World War II after being sold to the United Kingdom for use as a merchant ship.

Construction and acquisition

Westpool was laid down as the steel-hulled, single-screw Design 1013 commercial cargo ship SS Westpool by J. F. Duthie and Company in Seattle, Washington, for the United States Shipping Board. Completed in 1918, she was inspected by the U.S. Navy for possible World War I service and given the naval registry identification number 3675. The Shipping Board transferred her to the Navy on 2 November 1918, and the Navy commissioned her at Seattle the same day as USS Westpool (ID-3675).

Navy career
Departing Seattle on 8 November 1918 – three days before the armistice with Germany that brought World War I to an end – Westpool steamed to the Panama Canal Zone, where she loaded a cargo for the Panama Railroad Company. She departed the Canal Zone on 9 December 1918 and  proceeded to New York City, where she arrived on 20 December 1918 and discharged her cargo. She then loaded 5,002 tons of United States Army cargo and departed New York on 1 February 1919, bound for Antwerp, Belgium.

Arriving at Antwerp on 18 February 1919, Westpool unloaded part of her cargo before moving to Swansea, Wales, late in February 1919. She discharged the rest of her cargo there between 1 and 5 March 1919, then got underway on 5 March 1919 for New York City, where she made port on 23 March 1919.

Decommissioning and disposal

Westpool was decommissioned at New York on 31 March 1919. She was simultaneously struck from the Navy list and transferred back to the U.S. Shipping Board that day.

Later career
Once again SS Westpool, the ship remained under Shipping Board control and was in and out of service at various times until the late 1930s.

Early in World War II, the British government purchased Westpool to help to alleviate the shipping shortage the United Kingdom faced due to losses to German submarines. After a brief career in British service, Westpool was on a voyage from Halifax, Nova Scotia, Canada, to Liverpool, England, carrying 7,144 tons of scrap iron as a part of Convoy SC 26 when she was sunk on 3 April 1941 by the German submarine  with the loss of 35 members of her crew.

Notes

References
 
 Online Library of Selected Images: Civilian Ships: S.S. Westpool (American Freighter, 1918). Served as USS Westpool (ID # 3675) in 1918-1919 
 NavSource Online: Section Patrol Craft Photo Archive Westpool (ID 3675)

Design 1013 ships of the United States Navy
World War I cargo ships of the United States
Ships built by J. F. Duthie & Company
1918 ships
World War II merchant ships of the United Kingdom
Design 1013 ships of the Ministry of War Transport
Ships sunk by German submarines in World War II
World War II shipwrecks in the Atlantic Ocean